Ülo Ilmar Sooster (October 17, 1924 in Ühtri, Käina Parish – October 25, 1970 in Moscow) was an Estonian nonconformist painter.

Ülo Sooster was born the village of Ühtri on the Estonian island of Hiiumaa. He was the son of Johannes Sooster and Veera Sooster (née Tatter) and had a sister, Meedi, two years younger. His father was later remarried to Linda Vahtras. He was educated at Tartu Art College where he studied surrealism during the years 1945–1949. In 1949, his studies were cut short when he was arrested and, like hundreds of thousands of other Estonians, Latvians and Lithuanians, he was arrested and deported by the Soviet authorities to Gulag. Sooster was sentenced to ten years of hard labour in a Karaganda camp. In 1956, during the Khrushchev Thaw, he was released and 'rehabilitated' by denouncing Stalinism. He returned to Estonia in 1956, but in 1957 he went to Moscow, and began intensive practice as non-conformist artist. In 1962, he exhibited his work Eye in the Egg at the Manege exhibition that later was a turning point in the acceptance of modern art: though Soviet premier Khrushchev disapproved and threatened to send the artists to Siberia, the public understood that only membership in the artists' union would be denied and no one would be executed or exiled.

Sooster worked with Ilya Kabakov who wrote a monograph of Sooster's work which Kabakov kept throughout the Soviet period and which Kabakov finally published years later in 1996 after emigrating to New York.

Personal life
Ülo Sooster married Lidia Serh in 1956. Their son, Tenno-Pent Sooster, was born in 1957 and would go on to become an artist.

Enxhibitions
 1966 : Poland, XIX Festiwal Sztuk Plastycznych, Sopot – Poznań: Biura wystaw artystycznych.

References

1924 births
1970 deaths
People from Hiiumaa Parish
20th-century Estonian painters
20th-century Estonian male artists
Modern painters
Soviet painters
Soviet Nonconformist Art
Prisoners and detainees of the Soviet Union
Burials at Metsakalmistu